Two rival world chess championships were held in the year 2000:

Classical World Chess Championship 2000, a match between challenger Vladimir Kramnik and defending champion Garry Kasparov.
FIDE World Chess Championship 2000, a knockout tournament that took place in New Delhi, India and Tehran, Iran.